Shai Mehr Ali is a town in the Islamabad Capital Territory of Pakistan. It is located at 33° 27' 0N 73° 27' 45E with an altitude of 558 metres (1833 feet).

References 

Union councils of Islamabad Capital Territory